Giblet Gravy is the fourth album by jazz/soul guitarist George Benson.

Track listing

Personnel

Musicians
George Benson – guitar
Albertine Robinson, Eileen Gilbert, Lois Winter – vocals
Eric Gale – guitar, tracks 2, 4, 5, 7
Carl Lynch – guitar, track 1
Herbie Hancock – piano, tracks 3, 6, 9-12
Ron Carter – bass, tracks 1, 3, 6-12
Bob Cranshaw – bass, tracks 2, 4-5
Billy Cobham – drums
Johnny Pacheco – congas, tambourine
Pepper Adams – tenor saxophone, tracks 1-2, 4-5, 7-8
Ernie Royal – trumpet, tracks 1-2, 4-5, 7-8
Snooky Young – trumpet, tracks 1-2, 4-5, 7-8
Jimmy Owens – trumpet, flugelhorn, tracks 1-2, 4-5, 7-8
Alan Raph – bass trombone. tracks 1-2, 4-5, 7-8
Tom McIntosh – arranger, conductor, tracks 1-2, 4-5, 7-8

Technical
Esmond Edwards – producer
Val Valentin – engineer
Daniel Kramer – cover photography
Acy R. Lehman – art direction

References

1968 albums
George Benson albums
Albums arranged by Tom McIntosh
Albums produced by Esmond Edwards
Verve Records albums